Ancylolomia tentaculella is a species of moth of the family Crambidae. It is found in Southern and Central Europe, Anatolia and the Middle East.

The wingspan is 30–34 mm. The moth flies from June to July in England; in Southern Europe they fly from June to September.

The larvae feed on larger grasses.

References

External links 
 UKmoths
 Lepiforum.de

Ancylolomia
Moths of Europe
Moths of Asia
Moths described in 1796
Taxa named by Jacob Hübner